The Growing Process is the second studio album by American rapper Dizzy Wright. It was released on May 26, 2015, by Funk Volume and Warner Records. The album features guest appearances from Big K.R.I.T., Tech N9ne, Hopsin, Krayzie Bone, Layzie Bone, Jarren Benton, SwizZz, Berner, and Mod Sun, among others.

The album peaked at number 47 on the Billboard 200 chart.

Critical response
Dylan Yates of The Metropolist wrote: "While no new topics are covered within Dizzy's latest offering, The Growing Process is a solid attempt on the Las Vegas rappers part to give props to the lyrical aesthetic of the genre. An aesthetic, he suggests, that was more prevalent in rap 20 years ago. It also provides a soundscape rich enough to keep even the average Hip Hop listener's interest piqued." 
Nicholas DG of HotNewHipHop explained that even the applause-worthy messages of these songs wind up getting downplayed, sharing verse-vacancy with cocky bars, like, for example, on "Train Your Mind", where Dizzy attempts to take onus for molding rap culture and the community before putting himself on a pedestal.

Commercial performance
In its opening week, the album sold 8,575 copies.

Track listing

Personnel
Credits for The Growing Process adapted from AllMusic.

Dizzy Wright  primary artist, creative direction
Hopsin  composer, engineer, featured artist, producer, re-assembly
Alon Eida  engineer

Charts

References

2015 albums
Funk Volume albums
Dizzy Wright albums
Warner Records albums